Faraona (Spanish for female pharaoh) may refer to:

 Lola Flores (1923–1995), Spanish singer, actress, dancer and businesswoman, known as La Faraona
 Pilar Montoya (1960–2015), Spanish Romani flamenco dancer, known as La Faraona
 , a 1956 Mexican film starring Lola Flores and featuring Anita Blanch